The following is a list of courts and tribunals in South Australia:

Courts 
 Aboriginal Sentencing Court
 Coroner's Court of South Australia
 District Court of South Australia
 Environment, Resources and Development Court
 Licensing Court of South Australia
 Magistrates Court of South Australia
 Supreme Court of South Australia
 South Australian Civil and Administrative Tribunal
 South Australian Employment Court
 South Australian Employment Tribunal
 Youth Court of South Australia

References 

South Australia

Courts and tribunals